Millville is an unincorporated community located along River Road (County Route 521) and Shimers Brook in Montague Township of Sussex County, New Jersey. The Montague Grange and other parts of the community are in the Delaware Water Gap National Recreation Area.

History
The community got its name from the gristmills and sawmills built along Shimers Brook, then known as Chambers Mill Brook, starting in 1722. During the American Revolutionary War, Captains Abram Shimer and James Bonell were at the fort located here to protect the mills. Shimer built a mill here . In the 1790s, Jacob Shimer, his son, built a house on Old Mine Road, now River Road. It was documented by the Historic American Buildings Survey in 1970, before being demolished by 1980.

Historic district

The Millville Historic and Archaeological District is a  historic district encompassing the village. It was added to the National Register of Historic Places on January 30, 1984, for its significance in exploration/settlement, history, and industry. The district includes four contributing buildings and six contributing sites. The district boundary on the state register was increased on November 21, 2013, and lists River Road (County Route 521), Clove Road (County Route 653), Millville and Weider Roads. The county has posted a historical information sign on Clove Road.

See also
 National Register of Historic Places listings in Sussex County, New Jersey

References

External links
 
 
 

Montague Township, New Jersey
Unincorporated communities in Sussex County, New Jersey
Unincorporated communities in New Jersey
Delaware Water Gap National Recreation Area